Brian Matthews may refer to:

 Brian Matthews (actor) (born 1953), soap opera actor
 Brian Matthews (biochemist) (born 1938), Australian biochemist
 Brian Matthews (writer) (born 1936), Australian biographer and academic
 Brian Matthews (priest), Archdeacon of the Riviera
 Brian Matthews, artist, creator of online animated cartoon Stone Trek
 Bryan Matthews (1906–1986), British professor of physiology

See also
 Brian Matthew (1928–2017), English broadcaster
 Brian Mathew (born 1936), botanist